A total of 10 teams in each tournament (5 athletes per team) qualified for a quota of 100 athletes in curling at the 2018 Winter Olympics. A further 8 mixed doubles pairs qualified for a total of 16 athletes. Therefore, a total of 116 athletes qualified in total to compete in the curling competitions.

Summary

Final summary

Men

Women

Mixed doubles

Qualification timeline

Qualification system
Qualification to the curling tournaments at the Winter Olympics was determined through two methods. Nations qualified teams by earning qualification points from performances at the 2016 and 2017 World Curling Championships. Teams also qualified through an Olympic qualification event which was held in December 2017. Seven nations qualified teams via World Championship qualification points, while two nations qualified through the qualification event (nations who competed at the 2014 and/or 2015 Worlds and did not score points were also eligible to compete at this tournament). As host nation, South Korea qualified teams automatically, thus making a total of ten teams per gender in the curling tournaments. For the mixed doubles competition, the top seven ranked teams earning qualification points from performances at the 2016 and 2017 World Mixed Doubles Curling Championship qualified along with hosts South Korea.

Qualification points
The qualification points are allotted based on the nations' final rankings at the World Championships. The points are distributed as follows:

Note: Scotland, England and Wales all compete separately in international curling. By an agreement between the curling federations of those three home nations, only Scotland can score Olympic qualification points on behalf of Great Britain.

Standings

Men

Nations listed with 0 points were competitors at the 2014 or 2015 world championships, and were eligible for the final qualification event.

Women

Nations listed with 0 points were competitors at the 2014 or 2015 world championships, and were eligible for the final qualification event.

Mixed doubles

England earned 5 points in 2016 but only Scotland can score Olympic qualification points on behalf of Great Britain.

Qualification event

At the Olympic qualifying event, which was held 5–10 December 2017 in Plzeň, Czech Republic, the top two teams in the event qualified their nations to participate in the Olympics. The qualification event was open to any nations that earned qualification points at the 2016 or 2017 World Curling Championships (as listed above) or participated at the 2014 or 2015 World Curling Championships (the Czech men's team, the Norway and the Latvia women's team).

National qualifying events
Some countries select their teams through trial qualification tournaments.

 2017 Canadian Olympic Curling Trials
 2018 Canadian Mixed Doubles Curling Olympic Trials
 2017 United States Olympic Curling Trials
 2017 United States Mixed Doubles Curling Olympic Trials
 2017 Swiss Olympic Curling Trials (women only)
 2017 Japanese Olympic Curling Trials (women only)
 2017 Russian Olympic Curling Trials (women only)

References

Qualification for the 2018 Winter Olympics
Qualification